The Man Who Wasn't There may refer to:

Film
 The Man Who Wasn't There (1983 film), an American 3-D comedy 
 The Man Who Wasn't There (1987 film), a French thriller based on the Roderick MacLeish novel
 The Man Who Wasn't There (2001 film), a Coen brothers thriller

Literature 
 The Man Who Wasn't There (Gilbert novel), 1937
 The Man Who Wasn't There (Barker novel), 1988
 The Man Who Wasn't There (MacLeish novel), 1976

See also
 "Antigonish" (poem), also known as "The Little Man Who Wasn't There", a poem by Hughes Mearns